Totality may refer to:
 In astronomy, the state or period of an eclipse when light from the eclipsed body is totally obscured:
The coverage of the sun during a solar eclipse
The period during which an eclipse is total
 In philosophy, the concepts of:
Absolute (philosophy) and everything
A phenomenon discussed in Totality and Infinity by Emmanuel Levinas
The concept of totality as proposed by György Lukács
 In politics, totalitarianism is sometimes referred to as regime of totality
 Totality Corporation, a former professional services provider acquired by Verizon
 Totality principle, a principle of common law re the sentencing of an offender for multiple offences
 Plan Totality, a U.S. wartime contingency plan from the early Cold War period
 The "Totality", a fictional alien entity in the Star Trek universe
 The mathematical concept of a function being total vs. partial
 Totality (album)